KNPT (1310 AM, "Newstalk 1310") is a radio station broadcasting a News Talk Information format. Licensed to Newport, Oregon, United States. The station is currently owned by Yaquina Bay Communications, Inc., and features programming from ABC Radio, CBS Radio and Westwood One.

References

External links

NPT
News and talk radio stations in the United States
Radio stations established in 1948
Newport, Oregon
1948 establishments in Oregon